Clanis phalaris is a species of moth of the  family Sphingidae. It is found in north-eastern and southern India, Sri Lanka, the Andaman Islands and northern Thailand.

Subspecies
Clanis phalaris phalaris
Clanis phalaris cottoni Kitching & Haxaire, 2004 (Thailand)

References

Clanis
Moths described in 1777